Svendborg Rabbits is a Danish professional basketball team, from Svendborg. The club currently plays in the Basketligaen, the top division of basketball in Denmark. The home ground of the club is the Svendborg Idrætscenter, nicknamed the Kaninhulen (English: The Rabbit Burrow).

The team won gold in the best Danish basketball league in the 2009–10 season, silver in the 2006–07, 2007–08, 2008–09, 2010/11, 2011/12 and 2012/13 seasons. They won gold in the Danish Cup tournament in 2007, 2011, 2013 and 2022. They competed in the 2008–09 FIBA EuroChallenge.

Players

Current roster

References

External links
Svendborg Rabbits
Eurobasket.com Svendborg Page

Basketball teams in Denmark
Basketball teams established in 1958
1958 establishments in Denmark
Svendborg